Fast Eddie (born Edwin A. Smith; January 20, 1969) is an American house producer and hip hop musician from Chicago, Illinois.

Career
Prior to his entry into the realm of production, Fast Eddie was one of the premier DJs of the early Chicago house movement.
His talents earned him spots on WGCI and WBMX.  During that period, he produced one of his first singles in collaboration with Kenny "Jammin'" Jason entitled "Can You Dance", circa 1986. In 1987, Eddie came out with other house tracks such as "The Whop", based on the dance of the same name. Eddie then left WGCI for WBMX for a short time and then quit his radio DJ gigs to concentrate on producing. In 1988, Eddie scored one of his biggest hits with "Acid Thunder" on the DJ International label. However, it was the track "Hip House" that really established his career as a producer. Eddie popularized the genre of hip house.

He scored several hits on the US Billboard Hot Dance Music/Club Play chart in the late 1980s and early 1990s, including "Git On Up" (featuring Sundance), which spent a week at number one in 1989, but only reached number 49 in the UK Singles Chart.

However, Eddie tried his hand at gangsta rap in 1990 by forming the group America's Most Wanted, and many critics felt he should have stuck to his house music roots. Later that year, he released "Make Some Noise".

At some time during 1995, Eddie made two collaborations that are considered under the genre of ghetto house.  The first of these is titled "Booty Call" with DJ Sneak and the other is titled "Pump It" with DJ Funk.  Both songs gained a lot of airplay on Chicago radio and in clubs.

Discography

Albums
Jack to the Sound (1988)
Most Wanted (1989)
Straight Jackin''' (1991)House Music'' (2009)

Singles
"Can U Dance" with Kenny "Jammin" Jason (1987)
"Don't Want It" with Kenny "Jammin" Jason feat. Paris Grey (1987)
"Jack the House" (1987)
"The Whop" (1987)
"Let's Go" (1988)
"Acid Thunder" (1988)
"Yo Yo Get Funky" (1988)
"Can U Still Dance" (1988)
"Hip House" (1988)
"Jack to the Sound" (1989)
"Git on Up" feat. Sundance (1989)
"Most Wanted" (1990)
"Let's Do This" (1990)
"Make Some Noise" (1990)
"Watch Me Git Funky"/"Dance, Rock, Don't Stop" (1991)
"Bak on da Scene" (1992)
"No Other Lover" (1993)
"The Nite Life" feat. Nesha (1993)
"Girls Get Dum!" with White Knight feat. Juanie (1993)
"Yeah Yeah Yeah" (1993)
"Wild N Wet" with White Knight (1994)
"Booty Call" with DJ Sneak (1994)
"Pump It" (1995)
"Doggy Style" (1996)
"Over and Under (1997)
"Bang That Thang" (1997)
"Everything" (1998)
"I Want You Girl" (1998)
"Over and Under 2" (1998)
"Rock Yo Body" feat. Joe Smooth & Max-A-Million (2012)

Featured singles
"With This Ring Let Me Go" - Molella & Phil Jay present Heaven 17 meets Fast Eddie (1998)
"Yo Yo (Throw Ya Hands Up)" - Higher And Higher meets Fast Eddie (1998)
"Throw Your Hands Up (Yo Yo Get Funky - The Sequel)" - Jason Nevins vs. Fast Eddie (1999)
"Be My Queen" - Molella feat. Fast Eddie (2009)
"It's the Weekend" - Andrew Friendly feat. Fast Eddie (2009)
"Let Me Sip My Drink" - Robbie Rivera feat. Fast Eddie (2010)

Sampling
"Most Wanted" - James Brown "Get on the Good Foot"
"That's Bad" - Lyn Collins"Think"

See also
List of number-one dance hits (United States)
List of artists who reached number one on the US Dance chart

References

African-American musicians
American house musicians
Acid house musicians
Hip house musicians
Living people
1969 births
21st-century African-American people
20th-century African-American people